This is a list of the members of the European Parliament for Ireland elected at the 2019 European Parliament election. They serve in the 2019 to 2024 session, but two of them did not take their seats until the reallocation of seats which took place when the MEPs elected for the United Kingdom vacated their seats on the implementation of Brexit on 31 January 2020.

List

Notes

Changes

Footnotes

See also
Members of the European Parliament 2019–2024 – List by country
List of members of the European Parliament, 2019–2024 – Full alphabetical list

2019
European Parliament
 List
Ireland